″Music on a Long Thin Wire is a musical piece by Alvin Lucier conceived in 1977.

In his own words (1992): "Music on a Long Thin Wire is constructed as follows: the wire is extended across a large room, clamped to tables at both ends. The ends of the wire are connected to the loudspeaker terminals of a power amplifier placed under one of the tables. A sine wave oscillator is connected to the amplifier. A magnet straddles the wire at one end. Wooden bridges are inserted under the wire at both ends to which contact microphones are embedded, routed to a stereo sound system. The microphones pick up the vibrations that the wire imparts to the bridges and are sent through the playback system. By varying the frequency and loudness of the oscillator, a rich variety of slides, frequency shifts, audible beats and other sonic phenomena may be produced."

However, Lucier admits a long thin wire was at first only used to avoid the look of a laboratory experiment in favour of a more sculptural appearance; a short thin wire would have worked as well. He discovered that the best way to produce variation in the sonic phenomena was to pick a setting and leave the setup alone. He praised David Rosenboom for his ability to pick interesting settings.

It has been exhibited:
1979, Winrock Shopping Center, Albuquerque, and broadcast uninterrupted on KUNM (FM) for five days and nights
1980, Landmark Center, Saint Paul
1988, Gallery of the Center for the Arts at Wesleyan, Middletown, CT
2011, Tom Duff was duplicating the 1979 performance from Albuquerque on sfSoundRadio, an internet radio station from the San Francisco bay area, again broadcasting uninterrupted for five days (April 8–12).
2013, Brno, Czech Republic, The Exposition of New Music Festival
2015, Dartmouth College, DAX: Dartmouth's Digital Arts Exhibition

See also
I Am Sitting in a Room, Lucier composition also based on resonance

Sources

External links

Process music pieces